The Balasan (also: Sărăceaua) is a left tributary of the Danube in Romania. It flows into the Danube between Negoi and Bistrețu Nou.

References

Rivers of Romania
Rivers of Dolj County